Catherine Sola (1941–2014) was a French film and television actress.

Selected filmography
 The Black Monocle (1961)
 The Trip to Biarritz (1963)
 The Counterfeit Constable (1964)
 The Champagne Murders (1967)
 Sweet Movie (1974)
 Joséphine, ange gardien (1998) - 1 Episode
 Joséphine, ange gardien (2008) - 1 Episode
 The First Man (2011)

References

Bibliography 
 Peter Cowie & Derek Elley. World Filmography: 1967. Fairleigh Dickinson University Press, 1977.

External links 
 

1941 births
2014 deaths
French film actresses